Jenggawah District is a district in southern Jember Regency, Indonesia which has a small hill in the center of district.

Description
People in this area call the district Jenewa (from the acronym from Jenggawah) and they call themselves wonk Jenewa (Jenewa citizens).

The district has many Islamic boarding schools. The favourite school in this area is TK Negeri Pembina Jenggawah, SD Negeri 1 Jenggawah.

The majority of people work as farmers and traders.

Districts of East Java